Bernino is a male name which became legal in Denmark in 1975-76 after a legal procedure with the Danish authorities and the Ministry of the Danish Church.

Given names